Odh or ODH may refer to:

 RAF Odiham, a Royal Air Force station
 D-octopine dehydrogenase, an enzyme
Ohio Department of Health
Odh, a trigraph in Latin-script writing
Olivia de Havilland, (1916–2020), actress